Eulimacrostoma lutescens is a species of sea snail, a marine gastropod mollusk in the family Eulimidae.

Distribution
This marine species occurs off the coasts of Brazil within the southern Atlantic Ocean.

Description 
The maximum recorded shell length is 10.7 mm.

Habitat 
Minimum recorded depth is 610 m. Maximum recorded depth is 640 m.

References

External links

Eulimacrostoma
Gastropods described in 2002